In Good Company is a 2000 Greek film directed by Nikos Zapatinas. It was Greece's submission to the 74th Academy Awards for the Academy Award for Best Foreign Language Film, but was not accepted as a nominee.

Plot
Two men, Orestis and Pelopidas met on a car crash. Both have five days' leave. Orestis has got leave from the psychiatric clinic and Pelopidas from prison. Their course is crossed with a doctor and two policemen. Doctor is interested in Orestis and policemen are interested about some stolen money. Thanks to an aunt of one they manage to get away from the doctor and policemen who are watching them.

Cast
Giorgos Kimoulis as Orestis
Nikos Kalogeropoulos as Pelopidas
Evelina Papoulia as Catherine
Mimis Chrisomalis as Doctor
Maria Protopappa as Marina

Reception

Awards
winner:  
2000: Greek State Film Awards for Best Film
2000: Greek State Film Awards for Best Actor (Nikos Kalogeropoulos)
2000: Greek State Film Awards for Best Director (Nikos Zapatinas)
2000: Greek State Film Awards for Best Screenplay
2000: Greek State Film Awards for Best Costume Design
2000: Greek State Film Awards for Best Make up

nominated:
2001: Academy Award for Best Foreign Language Film (Not Nominated)

See also

Cinema of Greece
List of submissions to the 74th Academy Awards for Best Foreign Language Film

References

External links

2000 films
2000s Greek-language films
2000 comedy films
Greek comedy films